The Bayer designation A Cancri is shared by two stars/star systems in the constellation Cancer:

 A1 Cancri (45 Cancri)
 A2 Cancri (50 Cancri)

See also
α Cancri

Cancri, A
Cancer (constellation)